The Kurdish chiefdoms or principalities were several semi-independent entities which existed during the 16th to 19th centuries during the state of continuous warfare between the Ottoman Empire and Safavid Iran. The Kurdish principalities were almost always divided and entered into rivalries against each other. The demarcation of borders between the Safavid Shah Safi and the Ottoman caliph Sultan Murad IV in 1639 effectively divided Kurdistan between the two empires.

The eyalet of Diyarbakir was the center of the major and minor Kurdish chiefdoms.  However, other Kurdish emirates existed outside of Diyarbakir.

Policy during the Ottoman-Persian wars
The Ottomans gave the Kurds self-rule during the Ottoman-Persian wars, to ensure that the Kurds remain on the Ottoman side.  After the      Treaty of Erzurum in 1823 the Persian threat was reduced & the Ottomans brought the Kurdish Chiefdoms under direct control.

List

Major emirates

 Amadiya
 Ardalan
 Bahdinan
 Baban
 Bitlis
 Bohtan
 Bradost
Donboli
 Finik (Pinaka)
 Gurkil
 Hakkari
 Hisnkeyfa
Kilis
 Mokryan
Soran

Minor emirates

 Ahakis (Hakis)
 Amid
 Ana ve Hit (Anah & Hit)
 Aqçaqale
 Arabkir
 Ataq (Attack)
Baneh
 Beni Rabia
 Bîcar
 Biré (Biradjik)
 Cammasa
 Çemişgezek
 Dasini
 Deyr ü Rahba
 Ergani
 Erzen (Erzenjan)
 Eski Mosul
 Genç → Hançük, Çapaqçur
 Gürdükan (Kürdükân)
 Habur
 Hazzo (Hezo)
 Hizan
 Hüsnru
 Kigi
 Kulp
 Mecengird (Mazgêrd)
 Mirdasi → Eğil, Palu, Çermik
 Mihrani
 Suveydi
 Süleymandi → Mifariqin (Fariqin)
 Mardin
 Nisibin
 Pasûr
 Pêrtag
 Qulp
 Raqqa
 Ruha (Urfa)
 Sagman
 Sasun (Qabilcewz)
 Siverek
 Suruc
 Sincar
 Si‘ird (Sêrt)
 Tercil (Hezro/Hazro)
 Masyum u Tur (Nahiye-i Tur)
 Zakho
 Zirqan (Zeyrek)

See also
List of Kurdish dynasties and countries
Ayyubids
Shaddadids
Islamic Emirate of Byara
Prince-Bishopric of Montenegro

Notes

References

  By Evli̇ya Çelebi̇, Martin van Bruinessen, Hendrik Boeschoten